Cabinet selection is a term for cigars purchased in a large, square, plain Spanish cedar cigar box called a cabinet box, a slide-lid box or SLB, or simply a cabinet.  It usually has a wooden slide-lid, although hinged lids are occasionally seen.  The cigars are usually packed in amounts of between 20 and 50, but usually 25s or 50s (rarely in amounts of under 15, although Trinidad Robusto Extras and Reyes are both available in cabinets of 12).

Singles, 3s or 5s are generally packaged in cardboard or paper boxes, and the individual cigars come wrapped in a cellophane sleeve. In Cuban cigars, however, only machine-made cigars come in cellophane.

Cabinet selection cigars generally come packaged without cellophane, and (especially when purchased in 50s) often come in the wooden box tied together in a bundle with a silk ribbon with the maker's name and the cigar model stated on the silk ribbon. Sometimes they come without cigar bands (occasionally referred to as "naked").

Often, cigars are purchased this way for aging (maturing).

A third way of packaging cigars in a box, is usually referred to as box-pressed

References
Bati, Anwer - The Cigar Companion (1997, Reprinted: 1998-2000, 2003), 
Hacker, R.C. -  The ultimate cigar book, 3rd Ed. (2003), 

Cigars
Containers
Tobacciana